Riffraff is a 1936 American film directed by J. Walter Ruben and starring Jean Harlow and Spencer Tracy. The screenplay was written by Frances Marion, Anita Loos and H. W. Hannaford.

Plot
Fisherman Dutch Muller organizes a strike with his fellow thugs from the fishery, including the beautiful but tough Hattie Tuttle, against the owners of a tuna cannery. Jimmie is a teenager and uncle of two younger children. They all live with Pops, Hattie and his Aunt Lil in the same small dwelling on the wharf. The rich cannery owner Nick Lewis is also trying to romance Hattie with money and gifts, but she chooses Dutch.

Cast
 Jean Harlow as Harriet "Hattie"/"Hat" Tuttle
 Spencer Tracy as Rudolph "Dutch" Muller
 Una Merkel as Lil Bundt
 Joseph Calleia as Nick Lewis
 Victor Kilian as "Flytrap"
 Mickey Rooney as Jimmy Thurger
 J. Farrell MacDonald as "Brains" McCall
 William Newell as "Pete"
 Roger Imhof as "Pops" Thurger
 Juanita Quigley as Rosie Bundt
 Paul Hurst as Red Belcher
 Vince Barnett as "Lew", a fisherman
 Dorothy Appleby as Gertie, a waitress
 Judith Wood as Mabel, a waitress
 Arthur Housman as Ratsy and Bugsy
 Wade Boteler as Detective Bert Scanlon
 Helene Costello as Maizie
 Rafaela Ottiano as Matron

Production
On the night of October 30, 1935, 40 female extras on the set, many of them elderly or in frail health, were filmed in a simulated rain sequence that included the use of a sprinkler rig, fire hoses and wind machines. Multiple extras sustained bruises, temporary blindness, and loss of consciousness, with many suffering from pneumonia as a result. The crew was found to be understaffed and lacking the necessary supplies to properly warm and dry the extras between takes.<ref>"Are Extras People?". The Screen Guild's Magazine Vol. 2 No. 9. September 1935. Accessed 14 April 1935.</ref>

Reception
Contemporary reviews from critics were generally positive, both for the film and Harlow's new "natural" look, as she darkened her hair to what the press dubbed "brownette" before the film went into production. Frank S. Nugent of The New York Times praised the moments of "robust comedy" but lamented the serious scenes in which a "boisterous jest skids down the slopes of melodramatic routine." Variety published a positive review praising the "excellent cast" and dialogue that was "vigorous and well-written." Film Daily was also positive, calling the film a "lusty picture, full of action and comedy" with "fine performances" by Harlow and Tracy. The Milwaukee Sentinel wrote that there was "much hilarious comedy and robust action which takes away the sting of too much pathos" and that Tracy's work was an "excellent job."

John Mosher of The New Yorker wrote a negative review, regretting that the film "leaves Miss Harlow in the background for longish and rather dreary stretches ... I'd say of the picture that there is too much tuna fish, and not enough Harlow."

The film's depiction of organized labor drew some controversy. Max S. Hayes of The Cleveland Citizen'' attacked the film as "propaganda to prejudice the public against trade unionism."

Box office
According to MGM records, the film earned $717,000 in the U.S. and $330,000 elsewhere, resulting in a loss of $63,000.

References

External links 

 
 
 
 

1936 films
1936 drama films
American drama films
American black-and-white films
1930s English-language films
Films about fishing
Films directed by J. Walter Ruben
Metro-Goldwyn-Mayer films
Films with screenplays by Anita Loos
Films produced by Irving Thalberg
Films with screenplays by Frances Marion
1930s American films